INS Shankush (S45) (Ray of Light) is a  diesel-electric submarine of the Indian Navy.

References

Shishumar-class submarines
Attack submarines
Ships built in Kiel
1984 ships
Submarines of India